John Sherman Bradfield Elementary School also known as Bradfield is a public primary school located at 4300 Southern Avenue Highland Park, Texas, United States. The school, a part of the Highland Park Independent School District, also known as HPISD serves pre-K through 4th Grade. The school serves sections of Highland Park, and University Park.

History

The school is the site of a fatal September 27, 1967 airplane crash. An Aero Commander 560E, registration number N3831C, was on approach to Dallas Love Field when its left wing broke in half, sending the plane plummeting into the middle of adjacent Mockingbird Lane. Flaming wreckage tore through the school playground and narrowly missed the school building. The crash occurred during normal school hours, but the students had been sent home early so that teachers could hold a meeting; a lone boy was reportedly playing in the playground at the time, but he saw the approaching airplane in time to run to safety, and some boys playing football nearby were far enough from the crash site to avoid serious harm.  The aircraft, owned by Ling-Temco-Vought, was occupied by a professional pilot and 6 US military servicemen being ferried to Love Field; all 7 were killed. An investigation attributed the crash to metal fatigue in the plane's wing.

For the 1989-1990 and 2005 school years Bradfield was named a National Blue Ribbon School.

References

External links
 John S. Bradfield Elementary School

Public elementary schools in Texas